Maruman may refer to:

 A Japanese financial services company, now part of Tokai Tokyo Financial Holdings;
 a fictional cat, a character in the Obernewtyn Chronicles.